These are the results of the 2010 NACAC Under-23 Championships in Athletics which took place from 9 to 11 July 2010 in Miramar, Florida, United States.

Men's results

100 meters

Heats
Wind:
Heat 1: -1.3 m/s, Heat 2: -0.8 m/s, Heat 3: +0.4 m/s

Final 
Wind: +1.7 m/s

200 meters

Heats
Wind:
Heat 1: +2.0 m/s, Heat 2: +1.2 m/s, Heat 3: +2.8 m/s

Final 
Wind: +2.8 m/s

400 meters

Heats

Final

800 meters

Heats

Final

1500 meters
Final

5000 meters
Final

10,000 meters
Final

3000 meters steeplechase
Final

110 meters hurdles
Final 
Wind: +3.1 m/s

400 meters hurdles

Heats

Final

High jump
Final

Pole vault
Final

Long jump
Final

Triple jump
Final

Shot put
Final

Discus throw
Final

Hammer throw
Final

Javelin throw
Final

Decathlon
Final

20,000 meters walk
Final

4 x 100 meters relay
Final

4 x 400 meters relay
Final

Women's results

100 meters

Heats
Wind:
Heat 1: -1.3 m/s, Heat 2: -1.1 m/s

Final 
Wind: +2.2 m/s

200 meters

Heats
Wind:
Heat 1: +2.1 m/s, Heat 2: +3.5 m/s

Final 
Wind: +2.1 m/s

400 meters
Final

800 meters
Final

1500 meters
Final

5000 meters
Final

10,000 meters
Final

3000 meters steeplechase
Final

100 meters hurdles
Final 
Wind: +2.3 m/s

400 meters hurdles
Final

High jump
Final

Pole vault
Final

Long jump
Final

Triple jump
Final

Shot put
Final

Discus throw
Final

Hammer throw
Final

Javelin throw
Final

Heptathlon
Final

10,000 meters walk
Final

4 x 100 meters relay
Final

4 x 400 meters relay
Final

References

NACAC U23
Events at the NACAC Under-23 Championships in Athletics